Acantholimon afanassievii is a species of flowering plant in the Plumbaginaceae family. The native range of this species is in Central Asia and it was discovered by Lincz.

See also 
 List of Acantholimon species

References 

afanassievii